Tito "Noy" Castillo (born August 21, 1974) is a retired Filipino-American professional basketball player who played for the Shell Velocity and Purefoods Tender Juicy Giants in the Philippine Basketball Association.

PBA career

Shell Velocity
Known as a great 3-point specialist, he was drafted 2nd overall by the San Miguel Beermen in 1998 but was traded on draft day to the Formula Shell Zoom Masters for 1st overall pick Danny Ildefonso. He would have a decent career with the Zoom Masters for two years as starting point guard.

Purefoods
Before the start of the 2000 PBA Season, he was acquired by Purefoods TJ Hotdogs where his career would reach its peak. He led the team in scoring in 2001 and was awarded as the Most Improved Player and a member of the Mythical Second Team despite the TJ Hotdogs not winning a championship. He would win his 1st title with Purefoods during the 2002 PBA Governor's Cup. In 2006, he became a key weapon for the newly named Purefoods Chunkee Giants in their tile win in the 2006 PBA Philippine Cup where he hit clutch 3-pointers against Red Bull. He was also named as an All-Star during the same season. Because of recurring injuries, he retired from basketball in 2008.

National team
In 2000, he was a member of the Philippine National Team that competed at the FIBA Asia All-Star Extravaganza along former teammates Rodney Santos and Andy Seigle.

External links
Profile at pba-online.net
Retirement at purefoodsbasketball.com

1974 births
Living people
Basketball players at the 2002 Asian Games
Basketball players from Kentucky
The Citadel Bulldogs basketball players
Colegio de San Juan de Letran alumni
Magnolia Hotshots players
People from Bataan
Philippine Basketball Association All-Stars
Philippines men's national basketball team players
Filipino men's basketball players
Point guards
Shell Turbo Chargers players
Shooting guards
American men's basketball players
American sportspeople of Filipino descent
Asian Games competitors for the Philippines
San Miguel Beermen draft picks
Citizens of the Philippines through descent